Heena is a Hindi TV serial that aired on Sony Entertainment Television. The series began to air from 12 June 1998 and ran for five years, finishing on 11 July 2003. The series was telecasted on every Friday at 9:30 pm (IST). The opening theme song for the serial was taken from a Ghazal sung by Jagjit Singh titled as Koi Yeh Kaise Bataye

Plot 
The show was based on the trials and tribulations in the life of a woman. Heena who is married to Sameer, but her marriage is doomed from the wedding night itself when Sameer proclaims his undying love for another woman, Ruby. Finally their unhappy marriage ends in a divorce. A while after the divorce Sameers best friend Akram decides to marry Heena. Heena is very happy with Akram and thinks that he is the one. But Ruby strikes again and enters Heena's life as Akram's second wife.

Heena finally manages to be free of Akram and gathers courage to rebuild her life and establish her own identity. Heena looks forward to her new life as a mother and dreams of a beautiful healthy child. But Heena's trials are not over yet. At the hospital Heena gives birth to twins. However one baby gets kidnapped, Heena is in a critical state. In order to save her further trauma, her father tells her that one baby is dead. Heena eventually finds out that her child was kidnapped and is alive. After a lot of struggle, she gets back her second child and lives a happy life thereafter with Sameer and her twin children.

Cast 
Ram Kapoor as Dr. Amir
Simone Singh as Heena Nawab Mirza
Rakhee Tandon as Rubina
Vaquar Sheikh as Akram
Rahul Bhat as Sameer (Heena's ex-husband, and friend)
Parikshit Sahni as Nawab Mirza (Heena's father)
Maya Alagh as Begum Shagufta (Heena's mother) 
Rajeev Verma as Faizaan
Sudha Chandran as Sultana, (Rubina's aunt)
Zarina Wahab as Nagma , (Rubina's mother)
Lata Haya/Meenal Kenkre as Heena's aunty
Sonia Kapoor as Nameera
Bobby Vats as Tauqeer (nameera's husband)
 Dilip Dhawan as Dr. Sarfaraz Khan (Akram's father)
Neena Kulkarni as Gulnaar
Satish Verma as Heena's uncle
Kabir Sadanand
Milind Gunaji
Jaya Bhattacharya
Ketki Dave as Heena's neighbour
Nandita Thakur as Mrs.Sharma
Achala Vyas as Doctor
Jyoti as Poonam
Anupam Shyam as Mr.Saxena

External links
Official Site

1998 Indian television series debuts
2003 Indian television series endings
Sony Entertainment Television original programming
Indian television soap operas